Andrea Leonora Borrell Hernández (born November 10, 1963 in Las Villas, Villa Clara) is a retired female basketball player from Cuba. She twice competed for her native country at the Summer Olympics, finishing in fifth (1980) and in fourth place (1992) with the Women's National Team.

References

1963 births
Living people
Cuban women's basketball players
Basketball players at the 1980 Summer Olympics
Basketball players at the 1992 Summer Olympics
Olympic basketball players of Cuba
Basketball players at the 1979 Pan American Games
Basketball players at the 1983 Pan American Games
Basketball players at the 1991 Pan American Games
Pan American Games gold medalists for Cuba
Pan American Games silver medalists for Cuba
Pan American Games medalists in basketball
Medalists at the 1979 Pan American Games
People from Villa Clara Province
20th-century Cuban women
20th-century Cuban people
21st-century Cuban women